The 2016–17 Providence Friars men's basketball team represented Providence College in the 2016–17 NCAA Division I men's basketball season. The Friars, led by sixth-year head coach Ed Cooley, played their home games at the Dunkin' Donuts Center, as members of the Big East Conference. They finished the season 20–13, 10–8 in Big East play to finish in a four-way tie for third place. As the No. 3 seed in the Big East tournament, they lost in the quarterfinals to Creighton. They received an at-large bid to the NCAA tournament as a No. 11 seed where they lost to USC in the First Four.

Previous season
The Friars finished the season 24–11, 10–8 in Big East play to finish in a tie for fourth place. They defeated Butler in the quarterfinals of the Big East tournament to advance to the semifinals where they lost to Villanova. They received an at-large bid to the NCAA tournament as a No. 9 seed where they defeated USC in the first round before losing to North Carolina in the second round.

Preseason
Prior to the season, Providence was picked to finish ninth in a poll of Big East coaches.

Departures

Incoming transfers

Incoming recruits

Class of 2017 recruits

Roster

Schedule and results

|-
!colspan=9 style=| Exhibition

|-
!colspan=9 style=| Non-conference regular season

|-
!colspan=9 style=|Big East regular season

|-
!colspan=9 style=| Big East tournament

|-
!colspan=9 style=| NCAA tournament

References

Providence
Providence Friars men's basketball seasons
Providence
Providence
Providence